"Big Black Smoke" is the B-side to The Kinks' single "Dead End Street", written by Ray Davies. The song was not originally included on any album, but has since appeared as a track on the popular 1972 Kink Kronikles compilation and as a bonus track on the CD reissue of Face to Face.

The Big Smoke is a euphemism for London, the setting of the story told in the lyric.

The song makes reference to the recreational use of the drug Drinamyl with the lyric "And every penny she had was spent on purple hearts and cigarettes."

Personnel
According to band researcher Doug Hinman:

The Kinks
Ray Davieslead vocals, acoustic guitar
Dave Daviesbacking vocals, electric guitar
John Daltonbacking vocals, bass
Mick Avorydrums

Notes

References

Sources

 

The Kinks songs
1966 songs
Song recordings produced by Shel Talmy
Songs written by Ray Davies